Events from the year 1692 in England.

Incumbents
 Monarchs – William III and Mary II
 Parliament – 2nd of William and Mary

Events
 19 February – Princess Anne leaves the court after quarrelling with her sister, Queen Mary.
 2 May – first performance of Henry Purcell's semi-opera The Fairy-Queen at the Queen's Theatre, Dorset Garden, in London.
 5 May – Queen Mary orders the imprisonment of John Churchill, 1st Duke of Marlborough for alleged treasonous support of the Jacobites.
 29 May–4 June – War of the Grand Alliance: The threat of a French invasion of England is diminished by victory at the Battles of Barfleur and La Hogue.
 3 August – War of the Grand Alliance: the allied forces of England and the Dutch Republic led by King William III of England are defeated at the Battle of Steenkerque.
 8 September – an earthquake in Brabant of scale 5.8 is felt across the Low Countries, Germany and England.
 22 November – first performance of Henry Purcell's Ode to St. Cecilia.

Undated
 c.200 collier ships are wrecked in a storm off Winterton Ness with the loss of around a thousand lives.
 Lloyd's coffee house in London becomes the main office for marine insurance.

Births
 29 February – John Byrom, poet (died 1763)
 18 May – Joseph Butler, bishop and philosopher (died 1752)
 3 August – John Henley, minister (died 1759)
 John Huxham, surgeon (died 1768)

Deaths
 18 May – Elias Ashmole, antiquarian (born 1617)
 4 October – Charles Fleetwood, Parliamentarian soldier and politician (born c. 1618)
 c. November? – Edmund Ludlow, last surviving regicide, exiled in Switzerland (born c. 1617)
 19 November – Thomas Shadwell, poet and playwright (born c. 1642)
 9 December – William Mountfort, actor and playwright (born c. 1664)

References

 
Years of the 17th century in England